The National Emergency Employment Defense Act, aka the NEED Act, is a monetary reform proposal submitted by Congressman Dennis Kucinich in 2011, in the United States.  The bill has failed to gain any co-supporters and was not introduced to the floor of the house.

Introduction
Kucinich claimed that "H.R. 2990 enables money to be issued by spending it into circulation on programs approved by Congress — without taxing or borrowing."

Titles
The legislation's aim, according to its sponsor, was

To create a full employment economy as a matter of national economic defense; to provide for public investment in capital infrastructure; to provide for reducing the cost of public investment; to retire public debt; to stabilize the Social Security retirement system; to restore the authority of Congress to create and regulate money, modernize and provide stability for the monetary system of the United States; and for other public purposes.

Summary
According to the Congressional Research Service, a nonpartisan division of the Library of Congress, the NEED Act, in brief, would replace "Federal Reserve notes" with "United States Money" and dismantle the Fed. In this, the Act

Instructs the Secretary of the Treasury to originate "United States Money" to address any negative fund deficit spending;
Subjects to criminal and civil penalties any person who engages in "fractional reserve banking;"
Prohibits federal borrowing (except by a national bank, federal savings association, or federal credit union) from any source other than the Treasury;
Requires the Treasury Secretary to begin the process of retiring all outstanding U.S. debt by paying the bearers in "United States Money;"
Directs the Treasury Secretary to purchase all net financial assets in the Federal Reserve System, including the Federal reserve banks, and to return all reserves held by the Fed to the member banks in the form of "United States Money;"
Establishes various institutions to replace the Fed System: (1) the Monetary Authority responsible for monetary supply policy; (2) the Bureau of the Federal Reserve that administers  "United States Money;" (3) the Emergency Board tasked with recommending to Congress when a national emergency requires the President to issue a certification of emergency for the exercise of authority by the Monetary Authority as lender of last resort; and (4) a revolving loan fund in the Treasury for re-lending to banking institutions.
Sets forth a conversion process to replace fractional reserve banking with the lending of "United States Money;"
Sets a ceiling on interest rates.

Unemployment
Additionally, the Act would earmark funds for federal outlays in order to "create 50 million jobs" nationwide, in projects such as "federal & state infrastructure investment, education, health care," etc.

Support
The bill's introduction was "enthusiastically" supported by the American Monetary Institute, whose director, Stephen Zarlenga, helped draft early versions of the bill. and other opponents of fractional reserve banking, as well as by opponents of the Federal System, in general, such as the Positive Money organisation.

Kucinich stated that the bill would remove the power of creating money from the "privately owned and controlled" Federal Reserve System and would restore the authority of the U.S. Congress to "create money interest-free." He added that the bill would "address" America's "structural economic problems directly by creating over 7 million jobs" at a time when "the nation struggles with long-term unemployment at rates not seen in generations, and as infrastructure crumbles across the nation."

According to supporters and people who endorsed Kucinich's candidacy for Congress, the bill "would create millions of private sector jobs and rebuild America's infrastructure while paying off the national debt, all without raising taxes," while many supporters of the Occupy movement voiced similar sentiments. The Green Party in New York, in its official platform, has endorsed the NEED Act, while other Green Party organizations have endorsed the notions advocated in the bill, in a platform called "Greening the Dollar."

Criticism
The argument for "United States Money," as opposed to Fed-issued money, is not new. As far back as 1943, Abba Lerner had dismissed such arguments, pointing out that the central bank can, at any time, start "printing money" to match government deficit-spending "sufficient to achieve and sustain full employment."

Post Keynesian economists, such as L. Randall Wray, have argued repeatedly on the "foolishness" of  notions such as promoted by the NEED Act, pointing out that if money does not represent debt, in the form of a tax credit, then it is useless.

Economist and investor Warren Mosler has pointed out that the NEED Act is an "innocent fraud," because it undertakes to end a system that has  ceased to exist a long time ago.

Outcome
The bill has not yet been introduced to the floor. There were no other co-sponsors and there was no companion legislation in the Senate.

See also
Greenbacks
Gold standard
Stephen Zarlenga

Notes

References

External links
"Functional finance and modern monetary theory" by Bill Mitchell, 1 November 2009

Further reading
Friedman, Milton (1948) "A Monetary and Fiscal Framework for Economic Stability," American Economic Review, 38(3), pp. 245–264

Proposed legislation of the 112th United States Congress